This is a list of multiple Paralympic gold medalists, listing people who have won ten or more gold medals at the Paralympic Games. The Paralympics listed for each athlete only include games when they won medals. See the particular article on the athlete for more details on when and for what nation an athlete competed. More medals are available in some events than others, and the number of events in which medals are available overall have changed over time.

Most gold medals over career
This is a list of multiple Paralympic gold medalists, listing people who have won ten or more Paralympic gold medals. More medals are available in some events than others, and the number of events in which medals are available overall have changed over time.

 Updated to Tokyo 2021.

This list may not be complete, as the information from the International Paralympic Committee (IPC) website is based on sources which does not present all information from earlier Paralympic Games (1960–1984), such as relay and team members.

Most gold medals in one sport
This is a list of Paralympians that have won at least ten gold medals in one sport. The Paralympics listed for each athlete only include games when they won medals in the specified sport.
 Updated to Tokyo 2021.

This list may not be complete, as the information from the International Paralympic Committee (IPC) website is based on sources which does not present all information from earlier Paralympic Games (1960–1984), such as relay and team members.

See also
List of multiple Olympic gold medalists
List of multiple Olympic gold medalists at a single Games
List of multiple Olympic gold medalists in one event
List of multiple Paralympic gold medalists at a single Games

References
General
 
 See also references in the articles on each athlete.

Specific

External links
Multi-Medallists at the IPC web site

Multiple Paralympic gold medalists